Bela Rahma is an Arabic television drama.

Plot 
A rich beautiful woman (Fajer) lives with her little sister (Wedd) who has Down Syndrome, and her struggle with her addicted cousin (Jassim) to live a peaceful life.

Cast 
Zainab Al Askari
Miriam Al-Saleh
Abeer Al-Jundi
Ali Jumaa
Ibrahim Al-Zageli
Saad Al-Buanen
Hibba Al-Dedri

Music
The song was sung by Nabil She'al

Awards
Bela Rahma was selected the best gulf series in 2006, and Zainab Al Askari was also selected the best actress for her role for the second time.

References

Arabic television series